The Chinese Empire Reform Association, or Baohuang Hui in short, was an organization active mostly outside of Qing China that intended to support the Guangxu Emperor in his return to power in the Chinese Empire, which had been taken in a coup by Empress Dowager Cixi. It was formed in Victoria, British Columbia - where its named building still stands - on 20 July 1899 by Kang Youwei who had fled China to escape the death penalty. At its peak the association had chapters in 150 cities worldwide.

In 1900, the Chinese Empire Reform Association plotted with domestic correspondents to engineer an armed uprising in China, taking advantage of the chaos of the Eight-Nation Alliance marching on Beijing. The Association's promised funds were delayed, however, with some (such as Liang Qichao) accusing Kang of deliberately withholding funds due to his disagreement with the more radical co-conspirators such as Sun Yat-sen. This resulted in some cells starting action as originally planned while others stayed put, and the conspiracy was discovered by Qing authorities. Tang Caichang, the designated leader of the uprising in Hankou, was executed by the Qing government.

After suing for peace with the foreign powers, the Qing court softened its resistance to constitutional reform, so the Reform Association's platform shifted to co-operating with the push for top-down reform in China. Its main perceived threat changed to the republican revolutionaries led by Sun Yat-sen. In 1906, the Qing government adopted the policy of establishing a constitutional monarchy by 1911. Kang Youwei declared that the Association's goals were accomplished, and in 1907 it changed its Chinese name to the "Empire Constitutionalist Association" (帝國憲政會), which was much closer to the association's English name. In its new incarnation, the Association aligned itself with the Qing court and opposed the republicans. In 1910, the Association reorganised itself into the political party "Empire Unity Party" (帝國統一黨), which was the first officially registered political party in China, later renamed the "Friends of the Constitution Association" (憲友會).

After the Xinhai Revolution of 1911 and the establishment of the Republic of China in 1912, some members of Association went on to form new political parties that participated in elections to the republican parliament, while Kang himself agitated for restoration of monarchy, including organising the brief Manchu Restoration of 1917. The bulk of the "Friends of the Constitution Association" became the Democratic Party, which merged into the Progressive Party in 1913.

External links
Victoria's Chinatown - Chinese Empire Reform Association
 An Association to Save China, the Baohuang Hui 保皇會
Baohuanghui Scholarship
Chinese Empire Reform Association
A Chinese Reformer in Exile Panel Report, Association of Asian Studies (16 March 2012), China Heritage Quarterly, Nos. 30/31, June/September 2012.

Monarchism in China
1899 establishments in Canada
1899 in politics
1900s in China